Agdistis facetus is a moth in the family Pterophoridae. It is known from the Democratic Republic of Congo.

References

Agdistinae
Moths of Africa
Moths described in 1969
Endemic fauna of the Democratic Republic of the Congo